The Prince Albert Rural Water Utility or PARWU is a rural water utility independent of City of Prince Albert.  It was founded in 1993 by Colin Sheldon.

History
In 1993, a steering committee made up of RM of Prince Albert residents was formed.  At that time their aim was to ensure a safe and adequate supply of water to their families and operations.  PARWU was formed by bylaw through the RMs of Prince Albert, RM of Buckland, and RM of Duck Lake.

By 1995, the 120-kilometres of pipeline was completed for the initial 125 subscribers.  That water source was vital for area businesses such as hog, beef, and dairy producers, and an oilseed processing operation.

The PARWU partnered with the City of Prince Albert as Prince Albert would become the main source for the water.

Since the initial pipeline was completed, it has expanded.  On November 8, 1996 a signing between the PARWU and Muskoday First Nations took place at the Muskoday Community Hall.  The signing was witnessed by chief of Muskoday First Nations Austin Bear, Colin Sheldon who was the chairman of PARWU at the time, then councilor of Prince Albert Lawrence Joseph, Indian Affairs representative Ray Gamercy, plus a number of Muskoday residents. Although Muskoday was notified a year and a half earlier that the pipeline was going in their direction.  They were in negotiations until the November 8th signing.  The pipeline in Muskoday went towards rectifying the water problem facing the reserve.

Water advisories
On July 21, 2016, a leak was reported on Husky Energy's 16TAN pipeline where it crosses the North Saskatchewan River near Maidstone, Saskatchewan.  The spill effect around 70,000 residents in communities including North Battleford and Prince Albert.  The spill effected not only the City of Prince Albert, but also PARWU subscribers.  The City of Prince Albert shut off their intake valve in which they got their source of water from the North Saskatchewan River.  On August 17, 2019; general manager Ken Danger said PARWU subscribers would receive a "break on their bill," but didn't know how it would be done at that time.  They still experienced discolouration in their water as crews continued to clean it up.

On October 18, 2016, PARWU issued a boil water advisory on the RM of Buckland for precautionary reasons.  The day before (October 17), the City of Prince Albert experienced an issue with one of its pipelines near Central Ave. and River St. E..  The water was shut off PARWU in order to fix the issue before it was later turned back on.  On November 6, 2016; the precautionary drinking water drinking water advisory for both RMs of Prince Albert and Duck Lake were lifted.  PARWU said the system was flushed and the results of the results of the test samples deemed it had returned to acceptable limits.  When the advisory was originally put in place, general manager of PARWU Ken Danger said it effected users of the south line which included RMs of Prince Albert and Duck Lake.  The advisory was due to a depressurization of the water lines while they underwent repairs.

PARWU serves
Davis
Duck Lake
Halcro
McDowall
Muskoday First Nations
Red Deer Hill
RM of Buckland
RM of Duck Lake
RM of Garden River
RM of Prince Albert

Board members
Here are the current board members representing the RMs of Prince Albert, Buckland, and Duck Lake as per the official website.

RM of Prince Albert
Eric Schmalz - Chairperson
Richard Wilson - Board member
Wayne Acorn - Board member
Mike Ethier - Board member
Barton Franc - Board member

RM of Buckland
Don Fyrk - Co-vice Chairperson
Ken Danger - General Manager
Arthur Brandolino - Board member
Bob From - Board member
Bill Hayes - Board member
Teresa Hanson - Community member
Brenda McDougall - Community member

RM of Duck Lake
Remi Martin - Co-vice Chairperson
Paul Allman - Board member
Stanley Neufeld - Board member
Lois McCormick - Board member

References

Prince Albert, Saskatchewan
Buckland No. 491, Saskatchewan
Garden River No. 490, Saskatchewan
Prince Albert No. 461, Saskatchewan
Duck Lake No. 463, Saskatchewan

External links
Official site